In computer science, syntactic noise is syntax within a programming language that makes the programming language more difficult to read and understand for humans. It fills the language with excessive clutter that makes it a hassle to write code.  Syntactic noise is considered to be the opposite of syntactic sugar, which is syntax that makes a programming language more readable and enjoyable for the programmer.

Computer jargon